Ronnie James Dio – This Is Your Life is a 2014 tribute album to Ronnie James Dio, lead singer of several heavy metal bands, including Elf, Rainbow, Black Sabbath, Heaven & Hell, and his own band Dio. The album features many of Dio's contemporaries performing songs originally recorded by Dio. Tenacious D won the Grammy Award for Best Metal Performance at the 57th Grammy Awards for their cover of "The Last in Line", and Anthrax were nominated in the same category for their cover of "Neon Knights".

Dio died in 2010 from stomach cancer. Album proceeds were targeted for Dio's Stand Up and Shout Cancer Fund.

Track listing

Charts

References

External links
diocancerfund.org

Ronnie James Dio tribute albums
2014 compilation albums
Heavy metal compilation albums
Rhino Records compilation albums